DGB Daegu Bank Park, known as the Forest Arena in the Asian Football Confederation international matches, is a football-specific stadium located in Daegu, South Korea, and is the home stadium of the K League 1 club Daegu FC. The stadium opened in March 2019 and has a seating capacity for 12,415 spectators.

History
It’s site was originally “Daegu sports center” which was built in 1948, and it was renewed in 1960, which became sports complex. The former form of DGB Daegu Bank Park was main stadium of Daegu Sports Complex.

In 2017, The massive construction to remodel the sports complex. The main stadium was decided to be bult as a soccer stadium.

During the construction, the working name of the stadium was Daegu Forest Arena. DGB Financial Group bought the naming rights and named the stadium DGB Daegu Bank Park in February 2019, becoming the first stadium with naming rights in the K League history.

References

Football venues in South Korea
Sports venues in Daegu
Daegu FC
Sports venues completed in 2019
2019 establishments in South Korea
K League 1 stadiums